Derrick Appiah (Modena, 19 July 1994) is an Italian rugby union player who plays for Italinan club Colorno in the Top10.

Appiah has featured for Mogliano in Italy's National Championship of Excellence and the Amlin Challenge Cup and has also enjoyed spells with Rugby Parma and Modena Rugby.

On 4 February 2015, Appiah makes move to England with Worcester Warriors in top level competition, which is the Aviva Premiership from the 2015-16 season. On 5 May 2017, Appiah signs for RFU Championship outfit London Scottish ahead of the 2017-18 season.
From 2018 to 2021, Appiah played with Italian Pro14 team Benetton.

The prop was a regular for Italy U20s during the 2014 RBS Junior  Six Nations campaign, helping Italy to a 32-13 victory over Scotland and a fifth-place finish. Later that year, he helped Italy to a third-place pool finish during the 2014 IRB Junior World Championship - a campaign which saw his country defeat Argentina U20s 29-26.
In 2017 he was named in the Emerging Italy squad.

References

External links
Worcester Warriors Profile
ItsRugby Profile

Italian rugby union players
1994 births
Living people
Worcester Warriors players
London Scottish F.C. players
Italian people of Ghanaian descent
Italian sportspeople of African descent
Rugby Colorno players
Rugby union props
Mogliano Rugby players
Nottingham R.F.C. players
Edinburgh Rugby players
Benetton Rugby players